ATP/GTP binding protein like 4 is a protein that in humans is encoded by the AGBL4 gene.

References

Further reading